= California senators =

California senators may refer to:

- Members of the United States Senate representing California
- Members of the California State Senate
